Kautz Creek is a tributary of the Nisqually River, flowing from the Kautz Glacier, with its watershed in the Mount Rainier National Park of Washington. It drains southwest from Mount Rainier for about  before it joins the Nisqually River near Mount Rainier Highway. It is notable for being a severe flooding hazard due to the volume of summer glacier melt and its frequently changing course. The  Kautz Creek Falls on the headwaters of the creek was formed by the retreat of the Kautz Glacier in the past 50 years.

Kautz Creek was named after A. V. Kautz, an army officer and mountain climber.

Hydrology
The channel of Kautz Creek is very steep and narrow, because it has eroded through the relatively soft material that the lahars and mudflows have deposited.

Lahars
The creek is notorious for its history of severe floods and mudflows. On October 2 and 3, 1947, heavy rains triggered a jökulhaup (glacial lake outburst flood) from the Kautz Glacier- the largest flood after the establishment of the park. Other large debris flows have occurred in the Kautz Creek watershed in 1961, 1985, and 1986, with small debris flows occurring more frequently. The creek also jumped its banks in November 2006, destroying parts of the Kautz Creek Trail.

References

Rivers of Washington (state)
Rivers of Pierce County, Washington